The Highland Light Infantry (HLI) was a light infantry regiment of the British Army formed in 1881. It took part in the First and Second World Wars, until it was amalgamated with the Royal Scots Fusiliers in 1959 to form the Royal Highland Fusiliers (Princess Margaret's Own Glasgow and Ayrshire Regiment) which later merged with the Royal Scots Borderers, the Black Watch (Royal Highland Regiment), the Highlanders (Seaforth, Gordons and Camerons) and the Argyll and Sutherland Highlanders to form the Royal Regiment of Scotland, becoming the 2nd Battalion of the new regiment.

History

Early history
The regiment was formed as part of the Childers Reforms on 1 July 1881 by the amalgamation of the 71st (Highland) Light Infantry (as the 1st Battalion) and the 74th (Highland) Regiment of Foot (as the 2nd Battalion) as the city regiment of Glasgow, absorbing local Militia and Rifle Volunteer units. Its exact status was ambiguous: although the regiment insisted on being classified as a non-kilted Highland regiment, it recruited mainly from Glasgow in Lowland Scotland.

The 1st battalion was posted to South Africa in October 1899, after the outbreak of the Second Boer War. They were stationed in Egypt in 1902.

The 2nd Battalion saw action at the Battle of Tell El Kebir in September 1882 during the Anglo-Egyptian War: Lieutenant William Edwards was awarded the Victoria Cross for his actions during the battle. The battalion was stationed in England from 1883, but moved to India the following year. In February 1900 the battalion departed from Colombo to return home, and in October 1902 they were posted to Jersey, but three months later they were re-assigned to Alderney.

Following heavy British losses in the early part of the Second Boer War in 1899, many of the militia battalions were embodied for active service, including the 3rd battalion Highland Light (formerly the 1st Royal Lanark Militia), under the command of Lieutenant-Colonel William Story. The battalion served throughout the war, and 890 officers and men were reported to return home on the SS Doune Castle in September 1902, after the war had ended earlier that year.

In 1908, the Volunteers and Militia were reorganised nationally, with the former becoming the Territorial Force and the latter the Special Reserve; the regiment now had two Reserve and five Territorial battalions.

First World War

Regular Army
The 1st Battalion landed at Marseille as part of the Sirhind Brigade in the 3rd (Lahore) Division in December 1914 for service on the Western Front and saw action at the Defence of Festubert in November 1914, the Battle of Neuve Chapelle in March 1915, the Battle of St Julien in May 1915 and the Second Battle of Ypres later in May 1915. It then moved to Mesopotamia in December 1915 and saw action at the Siege of Kut in Spring 1916 and the Battle of Sharqat in October 1918.

The 2nd Battalion landed at Boulogne-sur-Mer as part of the 5th Brigade in the 2nd Division in August 1914 for service on the Western Front. It saw action at the Battle of Aisne in September 1914, the Battle of Ypres in November 1914, the Battle of Loos in October 1915, the Battle of the Somme in Summer 1916, the Battle of Arras in April 1917, the Battle of Cambrai in December 1917 and the advance to the Hindenburg Line in September 1918.

Territorial Force

The 1/5th (City of Glasgow) Battalion, the 1/6th (City of Glasgow) Battalion and the 1/7th (Blythswood) Battalion landed at Cape Helles in Gallipoli as part of the 157th Brigade in the 52nd (Lowland) Division in July 1915; after being evacuated to Egypt in January 1916 they moved to Marseille in April 1918 for service on the Western Front. The 1/9th (Glasgow Highland) Battalion landed in France as part of the 5th Brigade in the 2nd Division in November 1914 for service on the Western Front.

New Armies
The 10th and 11th (Service) Battalions landed at Boulogne-sur-Mer as part of the 28th Brigade in the 9th (Scottish) Division in May 1915 for service on the Western Front. The 12th (Service) Battalion landed at Boulogne-sur-Mer as part of the 46th Brigade in the 15th (Scottish) Division in July 1915 for service on the Western Front. The 14th (Service) Battalion landed in France as part of the 120th Brigade in the 40th Division in June 1916 for service on the Western Front.

The 15th (Service) Battalion (1st Glasgow), the 16th (Service) Battalion (2nd Glasgow) and the 17th (Service) Battalion (3rd Glasgow) landed at Boulogne-sur-Mer as part of the 97th Brigade in the 32nd Division in November 1915 for service on the Western Front. The 16th (Service) Battalion (2nd Glasgow), which was formed from former members of the Glasgow Battalion of the Boys' Brigade and was known as the Glasgow Boys' Brigade Battalion is particularly remembered for an incident at the Frankfurt trench at the Battle of the Ancre, the last offensive of the battle of the Somme, where around 60 men of D company were surrounded and cut off behind enemy lines. Relief attempts failed, but the men of the Frankfurt trench refused to surrender. After refusing to surrender, the Germans stormed the trench and found only 15 wounded men alive, three of whom died soon afterwards. General Sir Hubert Gough praised their stand under Army Order 193. Members of the 17th (Service) Battalion were painted by the war artist Frederick Farrell in Flanders in 1917.

The 18th (Service) Battalion (4th Glasgow) landed in France as part of the 106th Brigade in the 35th Division in February 1916 for service on the Western Front.

Between the Wars
In 1923, the regiment's title was expanded to the Highland Light Infantry (City of Glasgow Regiment). David Niven was commissioned into the regiment in 1930 and served with the 2nd Battalion.

Second World War

The 1st Battalion landed in France in September 1939 as part of the 127th (Manchester) Brigade in the 42nd (East Lancashire) Division for service with the British Expeditionary Force and then took part in the Dunkirk evacuation in June 1940. As part of the 71st Infantry Brigade in the 53rd (Welsh) Division, it later took part in the Normandy landings in June 1944 and saw action at the Battle of the Bulge in January 1945, the Battle of the Reichswald in March 1945 and the final advance into Germany.

The 2nd Battalion moved to Egypt early in the war and saw action at the Battle of Keren in March 1941. It then transferred to the Western Desert and, as part of the 10th Indian Infantry Brigade of the 5th Indian Infantry Division, saw combat at the Battle of Knightsbridge in June 1942 and the Battle of Fuka in July 1942. It took part in the Allied invasion of Sicily in July 1943 and, after a period in Yugoslavia, Albania and Greece, took part in the final advance into Northern Italy.

The 5th and 6th Battalions landed in France as part of the 157th Brigade in the 52nd (Lowland) Division in June 1940; after evacuation from Cherbourg later in the month, they landed in Belgium in October 1944 and took part in Operation Infatuate in November 1944 and the subsequent capture of Bremen in April 1945.

The 11th Battalion was converted to armour in 1942, becoming the 156th Regiment in the Royal Armoured Corps, but with the men retaining their Highland Light Infantry cap badges on the black beret of the RAC.

After the War
The Highland Light Infantry was amalgamated with the Royal Scots Fusiliers in 1959 to form the Royal Highland Fusiliers. The regular 1st battalions of the two Regiments combined at Redford Barracks, Edinburgh to form the 1st Battalion of the new regiment (1 RHF).

Uniform
The HLI's full dress in 1914 was an unusual one; comprising a dark green shako with diced border and green cords, scarlet doublet with buff facings and trews of the Mackenzie tartan. Officers wore plaids of the same tartan, while in drill order all ranks wore white shell jackets with trews and green glengarry caps.

The HLI was the only regular Highland regiment to wear trews for full dress, until 1947 when kilts were authorised. An earlier exception was the Glasgow Highlanders who wore kilts and were a territorial battalion within the HLI. The regiment had worn the tartan trews with khaki-drab tropical service uniform until 1900.

Battle honours and colours
The battle honours were as follows:
Borne on the regimental colours, representing actions fought by the 71st and 74th Regiments of Foot or the Highland Light Infantry prior to 1914:
"Carnatic", "Hindustan", "Sholingur", "Mysore", "Gibraltar 1780-83", "Seringapatam", "Assaye", "Cape of Good Hope 1806", "Rolica", "Vimiera", "Corunna", "Busaco", "Fuentes d'Onor", "Ciudad Rodrigo", "Badajos"' "Almaraz", "Salamanca", "Vittoria", "Pyrenees", "Nivelle, "Nive", "Orthes", "Toulouse", "Peninsula",
"Waterloo", "South Africa 1851-2-3", "Egypt 1882", "Tel-el-Kebir", "Modder River", "South Africa 1899-1902"
Ten representative battle honours for each of the First and Second World Wars borne on the queen's colours:
 First World War: "Mons", "Ypres 1914,'15,'17,'18", "Loos", "Somme 1916,'18", "Arras 1917,'18", "Hindenburg Line", "Gallipoli 1915–16", "Palestine 1917–18", "Mesopotamia 1916–18", "Archangel 1919".
 Second World War: "Odon", "Scheldt", "Walcheren Causeway", "Rhine", "Reichswald", "North-West Europe 1940, '44-45", "Keren Cauldron", "Landing in Sicily", "Greece 1944–45"

Colonels-in-Chief
1901–: F.M. Arthur William Patrick, 1st Duke of Connaught & Strathearn, KG, KT, KP, GCB, GCSI, GCMG, GCIE, GCVO, VD, TD
1947–: Princess Margaret, Countess of Snowdon, CI, GCVO

Regimental Colonels
Colonels of the Regiment were:
1881–1888 (1st Battalion): Gen. John Hamilton Elphinstone Dalrymple, CB (ex 71st Foot)
1881–1901 (2nd Battalion): Gen. Walter Douglas Phillips Patton-Bethune (ex 74th (Highland) Regiment of Foot)
1901–1903: Lt-Gen. William Kelty McLeod
1903–1916: Gen. Sir Henry John Thoroton Hildyard, GCB
1916–1918: Lt-Gen. Sir William Pitcairn Campbell, KCB 
1918–1921: Lt-Gen. Sir David Henderson, KCB, KCVO, DSO
1921–1929: Maj-Gen. Granville Egerton, CB
1929: Gen. Sir Henry Horne, 1st Baron Horne, GCB, KCMG 
1929–1936: Brig-Gen. Sir Alfred Granville Balfour, KBE, CB
1936–1946: Maj-Gen. Sir Andrew Jameson McCulloch, KBE, CB, DSO, DCM
1946–1954: Maj-Gen. Alexander Patrick Drummond Telfer-Smollett, CB, CBE, DSO, MC
1954–1957: Maj-Gen. Robert Elliott Urquhart, CB, DSO
1957–1959: Maj-Gen. Ronald Albert Bramwell Davis, CB, DSO (to Royal Highland Fusiliers)
 1959: Regiment amalgamated with the Royal Scots Fusiliers to form the Royal Highland Fusiliers

References

Sources

External links

The Highland Light Infantry Association
The Highland Light Infantry
British Light Infantry Regiments
British Army in the Great War: The Highland Light Infantry
National Library of Scotland: Scottish Screen Archive (1930s archive film of the 9th Highland Light Infantry on parade and at leisure)

 
1881 establishments in the United Kingdom
British light infantry
Infantry regiments of the British Army
Military of Scotland
Military units and formations in Glasgow
Military units and formations in Lanarkshire
Military units and formations disestablished in 1959
Military units and formations established in 1881
Scottish regiments
Regiments of the British Army in World War I
Regiments of the British Army in World War II
Royal Regiment of Scotland
Highland regiments
Light Infantry regiments of the British Army